Laurence Buddo Ayton Jnr (1914 – 21 February 1989) was a Scottish professional golfer. He was the son of golfer Laurie Ayton Snr and was born in Bishop's Stortford where his father was the professional. He was a member of the British team in the 1949 Ryder Cup but did not play in the matches. He played in The Open Championship 21 times with his best finish a tie for 15th in 1947.

Results in major championships

Note: Ayton only played in The Open Championship.

NT = No tournament
CUT = missed the half-way cut
"T" indicates a tie for a place

Team appearances
Ryder Cup (representing Great Britain): 1949
England–Scotland Professional Match (representing Scotland): 1937

References

Scottish male golfers
Ryder Cup competitors for Europe
1914 births
1989 deaths